A hippopotamus is a large, mostly herbivorous African mammal.

Hippopotamus may also refer to:
 Hippopotamus (album), a 2017 album by Sparks
 Hippopotamus (genus)
 Hippopotamus (hieroglyph), an Egyptian hieroglyph
 Hippopotamus (restaurant), a French chain of grill restaurants
 The Hippopotamus, a 1994 novel by Stephen Fry
 The Hippopotamus (film), a 2017 film adaptation of the novel
 Hippopotamus Defence, an opening strategy in chess

See also
 Hippo (disambiguation)
 Cyprus dwarf hippopotamus, an extinct species
 Hippopotamus antiquus or "European hippopotamus", an extinct species
 Hippopotamus creutzburgi, an extinct species
 Hippopotamus gorgops, an extinct species
 Hippopotamus melitensis or "Maltese hippopotamus", an extinct species
 Hippopotamus pentlandi or "Sicilian hippopotamus", an extinct species
 Malagasy hippopotamus, several extinct species
 Pygmy hippopotamus, a related species
 William the Hippopotamus, an Egyptian faience hippopotamus statuette from the Middle Kingdom